In enzymology, a D-alanine—poly(phosphoribitol) ligase is an enzyme that catalyzes the chemical reaction

ATP + D-alanine + poly(ribitol phosphate)  AMP + diphosphate + O-D-alanyl-poly(ribitol phosphate)

The 3 substrates of this enzyme are ATP, D-alanine, and poly(ribitol phosphate), whereas its 3 products are AMP, diphosphate, and O-D-alanyl-poly(ribitol phosphate).

This enzyme belongs to the family of ligases, to be specific those forming carbon-oxygen bonds in aminoacyl-tRNA and related compounds.  The systematic name of this enzyme class is D-alanine:poly(phosphoribitol) ligase (AMP-forming). Other names in common use include D-alanyl-poly(phosphoribitol) synthetase, D-alanine: membrane acceptor ligase, D-alanine-D-alanyl carrier protein ligase, D-alanine-membrane acceptor ligase, and D-alanine-activating enzyme.  This enzyme participates in d-alanine metabolism.

References

 
 
 
 
 

EC 6.1.1
Enzymes of unknown structure